Thomas Alexander Albert Herzfeld (born 29 January 1936) is a former Australian politician who was a Liberal member of the Legislative Assembly of Western Australia from 1977 to 1983, representing the seat of Mundaring.

Herzfeld was born in Berlin, Germany. His father was a banker, and he spent part of his childhood in Bangkok, Thailand, before arriving in Australia in 1948. After attending Guildford Grammar School, Herzfeld went on to the University of Western Australia, graduating with Bachelor of Engineering with Honours (BE(Hons)) and was accepted as an associate member of the Institution of Engineers Australia(MIE Aust). He initially worked as a civil engineer with the state government's Public Works Department in the Pilbara, Kimberley and Southwest of the State. Later he transferred to the private sector. He was the Consultant's representative on the construction of the East Perth rail terminal. From May 1975 to June 1977, Herzfeld served as a councillor for the Shire of Mundaring, including as shire president from May 1976. He was elected to parliament at the 1977 state election, defeating the sitting Labor member, James Moiler, and increased his majority at the 1980 election. However, at the 1983 state election, Herzfeld was defeated by Labor's Gavan Troy, who won by just 16 votes on the two-party-preferred vote. This result was challenged and eventually overturned in the Court of Disputed Returns, but Troy retained the seat at the resulting by-election. After leaving parliament, Herzfeld worked as a research officer for two Liberal Party leaders, Ray O'Connor and Bill Hassell, and also held various administrative positions in the party, including State Secretary, State Director and Campaign Director for State and Federal elections.

See also
 List of shire presidents of Mundaring

References

1936 births
Living people
Australian engineers
German emigrants to Australia
Liberal Party of Australia members of the Parliament of Western Australia
Mayors of places in Western Australia
Members of the Western Australian Legislative Assembly
People educated at Guildford Grammar School
University of Western Australia alumni
Western Australian local councillors